Per Günther (born 5 February 1988) is a retired German basketball player. He saw action in 500 games of the Basketball Bundesliga for Ratiopharm Ulm. He also competed with the German national basketball team at the 2010 FIBA World Championship. Günther is known as one of the best domestic players in Germany of his time, as he has played in eight BBL All-Star Games.

Professional career
Born in Hagen, West Germany, Günther began his professional career with German side Phoenix Hagen, then a part of the German ProA (the second tier of German basketball). Günther had a highly successful 2007–08 season for Hagen, averaging 14.5 points and 2.4 assists per game. Following the season, he was named the league's Most Improved Player and was voted to the Eurobasket.com All-ProA Second Team.

On the heels of his successful season with Hagen, Günther joined Basketball Bundesliga (BBL) side ratiopharm Ulm for the 2008–09 season, helping the team to a fifth place league finish. In the 2009–10 season, he averaged 6.6 points and 2.5 assists for Ulm, although the team struggled to a 13th-place finish in the league.

On 9 January 2016, Günther participated in his sixth BBL All-Star game and he was named the BBL All-Star Game MVP. Günther retired in May 2022.

International career
Günther was one of the top junior players in Germany. He first played with the German national basketball team at the 2004 FIBA Europe Under-16 Championship. He later competed with the junior squads at both the 2007 and 2008 FIBA Europe Under-20 Championship.

Günther's first major tournament as a member of the German senior national team was the 2010 FIBA World Championship in Turkey. He won a total of 65 caps for Germany's national team.

References

1988 births
Living people
2010 FIBA World Championship players
German men's basketball players
Sportspeople from Hagen
Phoenix Hagen players
Point guards
Ratiopharm Ulm players